Rock You Sinners is a 1957 British second feature black and white musical film featuring early British rock and roll, including Art Baxter and His Rock 'n' Roll Sinners, best known for their song Rock You Sinners. It is generally regarded as the first British rock and roll movie.

Plot
The film is set in London and is mainly set in clubs, cafes and small recording studios.

The success of his rock and roll television show brings fame for DJ Johnny (Phillip Gilbert), but trouble for his relationship with steady girlfriend Carol (Adrienne Scott).

Cast
Philip Gilbert as 	Johnny Laurence
Adrienne Scott as	Carol Carter
Colin Croft as Pete
Jackie Collins as Jackie
Michael Duffield as Paul Selway
Beckett Bould as McIver			
Tony Hall as Himself - Concert Compere		
Angus as Angus the dog
Tony Crombie as Himself - Leader, Tony Crombie and His Rockers
Art Baxter as Himself - Leader, Art Baxter and His Rockin' Sinners
Joan Small as Herself
Dickie Bennett as Himself
Don Sollash as Himself - Leader, Don Sollash and His Rockin' Horses
Rory Blackwell as Himself - Leader, Rory Blackwell and the Blackjacks
George 'Calypso' Browne as Himself (as George Browne)
Curly Pat Barry as Himself

References

External links
Rock You Sinners at BFI Screenonline

1957 films
British black-and-white films
British rock music films
British musical films
1957 musical films
1950s English-language films
1950s British films